CSV may refer to:

Computing
 Certified Server Validation, a spam fighting technique
 Cluster Shared Volumes, a Microsoft Windows Server 2008 technology
 Comma-separated values, a file format and extension
 Computerized system validation, a documentation process

Organizations
 CSV Apeldoorn, a Netherlands football club
 Christian Social People's Party, a political party in Luxembourg
 Clerics of Saint Viator, a Roman Catholic institute
 Community Service Volunteers, a British charity
 Confederación Sudamericana de Voleibol (South American Volleyball Confederation)
 Conseil scolaire Viamonde, a public school board in Ontario, Canada

Transportation
 Chevrolet Special Vehicles, Holden racing car
 Corsa Specialised Vehicles, an Australia car-maker
 GM U platform, General Motors cross-over sport vans

Other
 C. S. Venkataraman, a mathematician from Kerala, India
 ČSV, a Sámi initialism
 Character Strengths and Virtues, 2004 book
 Creating shared value, a business concept